Microsoft's Future Social Experiences (FUSE) Labs was started by Ray Ozzie and is run by Lili Cheng. The group focuses on real-time and media rich experiences and is located in Bellevue, WA. It used to have offices in Cambridge, Massachusetts, and Cambridge, UK. A similar, earlier initiative was Microsoft Live Labs, a collaboration between Microsoft Research and MSN which ended in 2010.

Projects
 - Microsoft Bot Framework & Conversational AI tools for developers.
Bing Twitter - Find out what topics are hottest on Twitter.
Docs.com - Discover, create and share Office docs with your Facebook friends
So.cl - Social search service
Kodu Game Lab - Kodu Game Lab.

References

External links
FUSE website

Docs.com announced by Mark Zuckerberg, Lili Cheng and Pat Kinsel
First Look at Docs.com by ZDnet

Microsoft divisions